The 1991 du Maurier Classic was contested from September 12–15 at Vancouver Golf Club. It was the 19th edition of the du Maurier Classic, and the 13th edition as a major championship on the LPGA Tour.

This event was won by Nancy Scranton.

Final leaderboard

External links
 Golf Observer source

Canadian Women's Open
Sport in Coquitlam
du Maurier Classic
du Maurier Classic
du Maurier
du Maurier Classic
du Maurier Classic